Adorata is the only EP by The Gutter Twins, released initially as an iTunes exclusive on September 2, 2008.  Within a couple of weeks, Adorata was released in DRM-free, 320kbit/s MP3, a superior audio quality in comparison to iTunes, through the Sub Pop Records website. The EP was mostly recorded during sessions for their first album, Saturnalia. This is the band's last album before the band's dissolution in 2011.

Track listing

References

External links
 Official MySpace page

2008 EPs
The Gutter Twins albums
Sub Pop EPs